Universal usability refers to the design of information and communications products and services that are usable for every citizen. The concept has been advocated by Professor Ben Shneiderman, a computer scientist at the Human-Computer Interaction Lab at the University of Maryland, College Park.  He also provided a more practical definition of universal usability – "having more than 90% of all households as successful users of information and communications services at least once a week."
The concept of universal usability ("usable by all") is closely related to the concepts of universal design and design for all. These three concepts altogether cover, from the user's end to the developer's end, the three important research areas of information and communications technology (ICT): use, access, and design. tite

Challenges 
There are three major challenges to universal usability:
Supporting a broad range of hardware, software, and network access. With the advance of ICT, users' hardware, software, and network configurations are changing. The variety of ICT products creates complex systems with a broad range of hybridity. For example, would a software product be usable to users running Windows XP on a Centrino laptop with broadband Internet access and to those who have Windows 98 on a Pentium II desktop with 56K dial-up?
Accommodating individual differences among users, such as age, gender, abilities, literacy, culture, income, and so forth. Individual differences can be roughly categorized into three types: physical, cognitive, and socio-cultural. In the field of HCI, research attempts have been centering on accommodating physical and cognitive differences by isolating various specific factors such as spatial ability, speed of movement, eye–hand coordination, and so forth. However, previous literature has demonstrated that individual differences are difficult to pin down and difficult to generalize from one context to another. 
Bridging the knowledge gap between what users know and what they need to know about a specific system. Two issues need to be resolved: (i) Building a user model to access individual user's background knowledge on a specific system; (ii) Integrating the mechanism of evolutionary learning.

Principles 
The key to universal usability is recognizing the diversity of user population and user needs. There is no "average" user on whom a system should be based. Although in some cases it is possible to accommodate technology variety and individual differences in one system, multi-layer designs are the most promising approach to achieving universal usability. That is, when a single design cannot accommodate a large fraction of the user population, multiple versions or adjustment controls should be available to users. For example, a novice user can be provided with only a few options; after gaining confidence and experience, the user can choose to progress to higher levels of tasks and the accompanying interface.  

Sarah Horton has developed a set of universal usability guidelines for web design. The basic principles are:
 Design simply: Design simple sites, emphasizing important elements and using simple structures and clean, standards-based markup.
 Build well: Take full advantage of these inherent properties, such as fallbacks, flexibility, and user control, to construct universally usable Web sites.
 Favor HTML over other formats: HTML is the best format for universal usability. Provide documents in nonstandard formats, such as PDF and Flash, only as an alternative to accessible html.

Harry Hochheiser and Ben Shneiderman have also developed the Universal Usability Statement Template, which describes a Web site's content, browser requirements, network requirements, and other characteristics that may influence its usability.

Electronic curb-cuts 
The analogy "curb-cut" has been used by advocates of universal usability to explain how ICT products designed for disabled users can be beneficial to all users. Sidewalk curb-cuts are added to accommodate wheelchair users, but the benefits extend to baby carriage pushers, delivery service workers, bicyclists, and travelers with roller bags. In the context of ICT design and development, universal usability is often tied to meeting the needs of people with disabilities. The adaptability needed for users with physical, visual, auditory, or cognitive disabilities is likely to benefit users with differing preferences, tasks, hardware, etc. Hence, electronic curb-cuts – system functions that are designed for people with disabilities – may be usable by everyone in various usage situations. It might be expensive to transform an existing system to meet universal usability standards, but the extra cost of integrating electronic curb-cuts into a new system can be minimalized.

Current research development 

Current trends in universal usability research include: 
 Multimodal or adaptive user interface
 Universal usability of commercial and e-government websites
 Interface solutions for older adult users and users with disabilities
 Contextualization of universal usability

Scholarly papers on these four areas have been presented at the 1st Conference on Universal Usability in Arlington, VA, USA (2000) and the 2nd Conference on Universal Usability in Vancouver, Canada (2003).

Examples 

 Computer systems allowing the interchangeable use of several input devices, e.g. track ball, mouse keyboard, joy stick or laser pointer.
 Computer keyboard that accommodate the physical differences between user, e.g. distance between keys, size of keys, and required pressure.
 IBM's Web Adaptation Technology transforms Web pages "on-the-fly" to meet individual needs.
 Websites that provide both multimedia version (for high bandwidth users) and text-only version (for low bandwidth users).
 NIH Senior Health features "one-click" text adjustment, contrast control, and text-to-speech technology.

See also 
 Usability
 Usability testing
 Universal design
 World Usability Day
 Knowbility

References 
 Benyon, D. R. (1993). Accommodating individual differences through an adaptive user interface. In M. Schneider-Hufschmidt, T. Khme & U. Malinowski (Eds.), Adaptive User Interfaces: Results and Prospects. Amsterdam, North-Holland: Elsevier Science Publications.
 Horton, Sarah (2005). Access by Design: A Guide to Universal Usability for Web Designers. Berkeley, CA: New Riders Press. (Online  ).
 
 Shneiderman, Ben, & Plaisant, Catherine (2010). Designing the user interface: Strategies for effective human-computer interaction (5th ed.). Boston: Pearson Education.

External links 
 ACM Conference on Universal Usability (2003) 
 Universal Usability: A Universal Design Approach to Web Usability
 University of Maryland, Human-Computer Interaction Lab Universal Usability Statement

Usability